The Nikon Coolpix P900 is a superzoom digital bridge camera announced by Nikon on March 2, 2015. With 83× zoom limit and a maximum 2000 mm 35 mm equivalent focal length, it was the greatest-zooming bridge camera at the time of its announcement, a record it held for almost two years, until the release of Kodak's Pixpro Astro Zoom AZ901 in early 2017 with its 90× zoom ratio. The record was later overtaken by the P900's successor, the Nikon P1000 on September 6, 2018, a record it still holds as of September 2020. The P900 complemented its shorter-zooming sister model, the Nikon Coolpix P610, which was announced a few weeks earlier. Also available is the Coolpix P950, which is nearly identical to the P900, adding several improvements, the most notable being a flash hotshoe, 4K video and RAW shooting.

References

P900
Superzoom cameras
Cameras introduced in 2015